In archaeology, a type site is the site used to define a particular archaeological culture or other typological unit, which is often named after it. For example, discoveries at La Tène and Hallstatt led scholars to divide the European Iron Age into the La Tène culture and Hallstatt culture, named after their respective type sites.

The concept is similar to type localities in geology and type specimens in biology.

Notable type sites

East Asia
Banpo (Yangshao culture, Neolithic Yangshao culture, China)
Liangzhu Town, near Hangzhou (Liangzhu culture, Neolithic, China)
Songguk-ri (Middle Mumun culture, southern Korea)
Suemura cluster of kilns – Kilns of Sue pottery (Middle and Late Kofun period, Osaka, Japan)

Europe
a river terrace of the River Somme (Abbeville, France), of the Abbevillian culture
Aurignac (Haute Garonne, France), of the Aurignacian culture
Hallstatt (Salzkammergut, Austria), of the Hallstatt culture
La Tène, Neuchâtel, Switzerland, of the La Tène culture
Vinča, Belgrade, Serbia, of the Vinča culture
Abri de la Madeleine (Dordogne, France), of the Magdalenian culture
Le Moustier (Dordogne, France), of the Mousterian culture
Saint Acheul (near Amiens, France), of the Acheulean culture
Butmir (near Sarajevo, Bosnia-Herzegovina), of the Butmir culture

Mesoamerica
Uaxactun (Maya civilization, Dept.of Peten, Guatemala)
Dzibilchaltun (Maya civilization, northern Yucatan, Mexico)
Monte Albán (Zapotec civilization, Oaxaca, Mexico)

Near East
Tell Halaf, Syria, for the Halaf culture
Tell Hassuna, Iraq, for the Hassuna culture
Jemdet Nasr, Iraq, for the Jemdet Nasr period
Tell al-'Ubaid, Iraq, for the Ubaid period
Uruk, Iraq, for the Uruk period

Northern America
Folsom, New Mexico (Folsom Tradition), United States
Clovis, New Mexico (Clovis culture), United States: generally accepted as the type site for one of the earliest human cultures in the North America
La Plata County, Colorado (Basketmaker II period of the Anasazi culture), United States
Barton Gulch of the Blackwater Draw Paleo-Indian culture
Adena Mound (Adena culture), United States
Borax Lake Site, for two of the earliest cultural traditions in California: the Post Pattern and Borax Lake Pattern.

Oceania
New Caledonia, of the Lapita culture.

South Asia
Kot Diji (pre-Harappanian civilization, Pakistan)
Harappa (Indus civilization, Punjab, northeast Pakistan)

References

 
Methods in archaeology
Bronze Age
Iron Age
Stone Age